Peterborough North End Sports Football Club is a football club based in Peterborough, England.

History
Peterborough North End Sports were founded in 2019, following a merger between Peterborough Sports Development, who were formed in the aftermath of World War I and Bretton North End, who were founded in the early 1980s. Upon the formation of the new club, Peterborough North End Sports were placed into the Peterborough and District Football League. In 2021, the club was admitted into the Eastern Counties League Division One. In 2022, despite finishing eighth in the Eastern Counties League Division One, Peterborough North End opted to return to the Peterborough and District League.

Ground
The club currently groundshare with Peterborough Sports, playing at Lincoln Road in Peterborough.

References

Association football clubs established in 2019
2019 establishments in England
Football clubs in England
Football clubs in Cambridgeshire
Peterborough Sports F.C.
Peterborough and District Football League
Eastern Counties Football League
Sport in Peterborough